Ripon is a city located in San Joaquin County, California. The population was 14,297 at the 2010 census. Ripon was originally known as Stanislaus City, but was renamed for Ripon, Wisconsin, in 1876.

History
Ripon, on the site previously known as Murphy's Ferry, Stanislaus City, and Stanislaus Station, was renamed for Ripon, Wisconsin, which was named for a city in North Yorkshire, England. Ripon's economy is largely agriculture based, known especially for its high production of almonds. In 1998, great expansion began for the city. Areas north of the Golden State (99) Freeway were slated for housing divisions, and huge swaths of agricultural land were slated for development. In 2003, the Jack Tone Road intersection was rebuilt, thus beginning a gigantic commercial development for two truck stops—Loves and the Flying J—that year. The next couple of years saw the addition of numerous restaurants and a shopping center.

Geography
Ripon is located at  (37.740478, -121.128224).

Demographics

The 2010 United States Census reported that Ripon had a population of 14,297. The racial makeup of Ripon was 11,392 (79.7%) White, 221 (1.5%) African American, 125 (0.9%) Native American, 599 (4.2%) Asian, 36 (0.3%) Pacific Islander, 1,208 (8.4%) from other races, and 716 (5.0%) from two or more races. Hispanic or Latino of any race were 3,177 persons (22.2%).

The census reported that 14,207 people (99.4% of the population) lived in households, 0 (0%) lived in non-institutionalized group quarters, and 90 (0.6%) were institutionalized.

There were 4,855 households, out of which 2,057 (42.4%) had children under the age of 18 living in them, 3,099 (63.8%) were opposite-sex married couples living together, 472 (9.7%) had a female householder with no husband present, 227 (4.7%) had a male householder with no wife present. There were 193 (4.0%) unmarried opposite-sex partnerships, and 20 (0.4%) same-sex married couples or partnerships. 896 households (18.5%) were made up of individuals, and 437 (9.0%) had someone living alone who was 65 years of age or older. The average household size was 2.93. There were 3,798 families (78.2% of all households); the average family size was 3.34.

The population was spread out, with 4,119 people (28.8%) under the age of 18, 1,210 people (8.5%) aged 18 to 24, 3,469 people (24.3%) aged 25 to 44, 3,811 people (26.7%) aged 45 to 64, and 1,688 people (11.8%) who were 65 years of age or older. The median age was 37.1 years. For every 100 females, there were 95.8 males. For every 100 females age 18 and over, there were 92.3 males.

The homeowner vacancy rate was 1.6%; the rental vacancy rate was 7.4%. 10,574 people (74.0% of the population) lived in owner-occupied housing units and 3,633 people (25.4%) lived in rental housing units.

Transportation
Ripon station is an Altamont Corridor Express commuter rail station planned to be constructed for service starting in 2023.

Education
Students are served by five K–8 elementary schools (self-contained at all grade levels), and one high school by Ripon Unified School District, located in the Central Valley. All schools have Academic Performance Index (API) scores above 700. Three of the elementary schools have API scores above 800.

Schools 
 Colony Oak Elementary - California Distinguished School
 Park View Elementary
 Ripon Elementary - California Distinguished School
 Ripona Elementary - opened 1965, California Distinguished School
 Weston Elementary - opened 1985, California Distinguished School
 Ripon High School
 Ripon Christian School
 Harvest High School

Notable people

 Gay Jacobsen D'Asaro, fencing champion
 Walter Hawkins, Grammy Award-winning gospel artist
 Edward L. Kessel, biologist
 Kim Johnston Ulrich, actress

References

External links
City of Ripon, California
Ripon Chamber of Commerce

Cities in San Joaquin County, California
Incorporated cities and towns in California
Stanislaus River